"Bikini Bottom" is a song by American rapper Ice Spice. It was released on October 28, 2022, through 10K Projects.

Background and release 
Ice Spice released her debut single, "Munch (Feelin' U)", in August 2022. The song went viral on social media platforms, after which Ice Spice signed with the record label 10K Projects. In early October, Ice Spice posted a snippet of a new song, "Bikini Bottom", on her social media platforms. The less-serious nature of the song's beat was compared by the public to background music in the American animated television series SpongeBob SquarePants, which the song gets its title from. Kenna McCafferty opined in Paper that "it [...] helps that Ice Spice can take a joke". The song was released on October 28.

Composition 
"Bikini Bottom" was produced by RiotUSA, who also produced Ice Spice's debut single "Munch (Feelin' U)". The song, which is under two minutes in length, features Ice Spice calmly rapping over a beat reminiscent of the strings present on a song featured in SpongeBob SquarePants, which the song's title references.

Critical reception 
Heven Haile in Pitchfork called the song "whimsical and fun", further opining that Ice Spice's lack of seriousness plays to her strengths.

Charts

References 

2022 songs
Ice Spice songs
Songs written by Ice Spice
Pop-rap songs